Kellogg Township is a township in Jasper County, Iowa, USA.

History
Kellogg Township was organized in 1868.

References

Townships in Jasper County, Iowa
Townships in Iowa
1868 establishments in Iowa
Populated places established in 1868